The King's Buildings (colloquially known as just King's or KB) is a campus of the University of Edinburgh in Scotland. Located in the suburb of Blackford, the site contains most of the schools within the College of Science and Engineering, excepting only the School of Informatics and part of the School of Geosciences, which are located at the central George Square campus. Scotland's Rural College (SRUC) and Biomathematics and Statistics Scotland (BioSS) also have facilities there.

History

In 1919 Edinburgh University bought the land of West Mains Farm in the south of the city with the intention of building a satellite campus specialising in the Sciences. The first building was the Chemistry Building (renamed the Joseph Black Building) designed by Arthur Forman Balfour Paul in 1919. Building started in 1920 and was completed after 1924 by John Fraser Matthew. This was followed by the Zoology Building (renamed the Ashworth Laboratories) dating from 1929, also by Matthew.

The name "King's Buildings" is a reference to then-king George V.

During World War II, the Genetics Institute part of King's Buildings was used as the location for the first War Office Selection Board.

University of Edinburgh celebrated more than 100 years of the site in 2021 with their KB101 campaign which included a lecture series and newly commissioned artworks by Katie Paterson.

Street and building names

All the campus properties shared one of two addresses until, in 2014, the University approached the City of Edinburgh Council, as the road naming authority, with a request to name all the individual roads within the campus to honour famous scientists and mathematicians associated with the University. When the proposed changes were discussed in City of Edinburgh Development Management Sub-Committee, it was pointed out that some of the names were overly long and cumbersome. Two of the proposed names were rejected as unsuitable as Christina Miller was deemed to be too similar sounding to Christie Miller, who already appears in three street names; and Robert Edwards did not meet the Council’s 10-year waiting period for deceased people. The University eventually substituted Marion Ross Road for Christina Miller Road and James Dewar Road for Robert Edwards Road.

The final agreed street system was:
 Charlotte Auerbach Road
 Thomas Bayes Road
 Max Born Crescent
 David Brewster Road
 Alexander Crum Brown Road
 James Dewar Road
 James Hutton Road
 KB Square
 Colin MacLaurin Road
 Marion Ross Road
 Peter Guthrie Tait Road
 Robert Stevenson Road

Buildings

Building names at KB reflect the spectrum of British science:

 Alexander Graham Bell Building
 Alrick Building
 Ann Walker Building
 Ashworth Laboratories
 Biospace
 Centre for Science at Extreme Conditions
 Christina Miller Building
 Computing Services
 Crew Building
 Crew Laboratory (previously the William Dudgeon Labs and earlier Mouse House)
 Daniel Rutherford Building
 Darwin Building
 Engineering Lecture Theatre
 Erskine Williamson Building
 Faraday Building
 Fleeming Jenkin Building
 Grant Institute
 Hudson Beare Building
 James Clerk Maxwell Building
 John Muir Building
 John Murray Labs
 Joseph Black Building
 Kenneth Denbigh Building
 King's Buildings Centre
 King's Buildings House
 March Building
 Mary Brück Building
 Michael Swann Building
 Murchison House
 Noreen and Kenneth Murray Library
 The Nucleus
 Ocean Energy Research Facility
 Peter Wilson Building
 Robertson Engineering & Science Library
 Roger Land Building
 Sanderson Building
 Scottish Microelectronics Centre 
 Structures Lab
 Swann Building
 Waddington Building
 William Rankine Building

On 5 August 2014, FloWave TT was inaugurated by Amber Rudd, UK Secretary of State for Energy and Climate Change. The FloWave Ocean Energy Research Facility is a world-unique,  diameter wave and current tank primarily focused on testing marine energy technologies and projects.

In 2019 the data centre in the James Clerk Maxwell Building was named in honour of Mary Somerville and in 2020 the IT skills training room was named in honour of Xia Peisu.

Other facilities
 King's Buildings House, also known as KB House, is the student union at King's Buildings, run by Edinburgh University Students' Association (EUSA). The Mayfield Bar and Blackford Lounge serve hot food and drinks on the ground floor, along with the KB House Shop and a games room. A full servery, Common Room and Kitchen, can be found upstairs, serving a wider variety of hot food. The union is also home to The Advice Place student advisory service and KB Gym, which includes two badminton and two squash courts.
 KB Centre Shop is another EUSA-run shop, located in the KB Centre. The store stocks convenience products, alongside hot drinks, made-to-order sandwiches and hot food to take away.
 Cafés include The Magnet Café in the James Clerk Maxwell Building, KB Café in the Noreen and Kenneth Murray Library, Upstairs Café in the Swann Building, XY Café in the Roger Land Building, Brucks Café in the Mary Bruck building, and The Eng Inn in the Hudson Beare Building.

King's Buildings 5 Mile Road Race
The KB 5 Road Race is organised every year by the Edinburgh University Hare and Hounds Running Club. It is usually held in late February or early March. The race starts and finishes inside the King's Buildings campus. The course consists of a  road loop around the streets of south Edinburgh, with quite a few hills, though none of them steep. The race is popular with student and local club runners and usually attracts around 250 participants.

Notes

References

External links

 College of Science and Engineering website
 University of Edinburgh website
 University of Edinburgh – King's Buildings campus map

Buildings and structures of the University of Edinburgh
University and college campuses in the United Kingdom
University of Edinburgh